Sardar Ghulam Abbas is a Pakistani politician who was a member of the Provincial Assembly of the Punjab, from 1985 to 1988, and then again from 1993 to 1996.

Political career
He was elected to the Provincial Assembly of the Punjab from Constituency PP-12 – Jhelum in 1985 Pakistani general election.

He was again elected to the Provincial Assembly of the Punjab as a candidate of Pakistan Peoples Party from Constituency PP-18 – Chakwal in 1993 Pakistani general election.

He joined Pakistan Tehreek-e-Insaaf (PTI) in November 2011 but later in 2012 he had quit PTI after developing differences with Imran Khan.

In 2016, he joined Pakistan Muslim League (Nawaz) (PML-N) but had quit in 2018 to join PTI before elections.

In 2018, he rejoined Pakistan Tehreek-e-Insaaf (PTI).

References

Living people
Punjab MPAs 1985–1988
Punjab MPAs 1993–1996
Pakistan People's Party MPAs (Punjab)
Year of birth missing (living people)